Mike Cuffe is a Republican member of the Montana Legislature.  He was first elected to House District 2 in 2017. Cuffe now represents Senate District 1 in the Lincoln County area.  Cuffe received a Journalism degree from the University of Montana.  He previously worked as an editor for Libby Western News  and as a press secretary for Dick Shoup.

See also 
 Montana House of Representatives, District 2

References

Living people
Republican Party members of the Montana House of Representatives
University of Montana alumni
People from Eureka, Montana
1946 births
21st-century American politicians